Svetlana Mitkova Isaeva-Leseva (Bulgarian: Светлана Миткова Исаева-Лесева; born 18 March 1967 in Montana, Bulgaria) is a retired Bulgarian athlete who specialised in the high jump. She represented her country at the 1992 Summer Olympics as well as two indoor and three outdoor World Championships. Her biggest success is the silver medal at the 1986 European Championships in Stuttgart.

Her personal best in the event is 2.00 metres outdoors (Dráma 1987) and 1.94 metres indoors (Pireaus 1994).

Competition record

References

1967 births
Living people
People from Montana, Bulgaria
Bulgarian female high jumpers
Olympic athletes of Bulgaria
Athletes (track and field) at the 1992 Summer Olympics
World Athletics Championships athletes for Bulgaria
Universiade medalists in athletics (track and field)
Goodwill Games medalists in athletics
Universiade gold medalists for Bulgaria
Competitors at the 1986 Goodwill Games
Competitors at the 1994 Goodwill Games
20th-century Bulgarian women
21st-century Bulgarian women